Agim Ademi (born 19 October 1961) is a Kosovan football administrator and former player who is the current president of the Football Federation of Kosovo from 6 July 2018.

Life and career
Agim Ademi was born on 19 October 1961 into an Albanian family in the city of Pristina, Kosovo, at the time part of the Yugoslavia. His son, Trim Ademi known as Capital T, is a rapper, singer, songwriter, philanthropist and former football player. He has a master's degree in Security and Emergency Sciences, and is known as a successful businessman in the field of construction, hospitality and manufacturing.

From 1975 to 1988, he was an active footballer, while from 1992 to 2000, Ademi gave his contribution to the development of Kosovar football as chairman and donor of Kosova Prishtinë, a club which in a period had a successful appearance in the elite of Kosovar football. From 2000 until 6 July 2018, he gave his contribution as vice-president of Football Federation of Kosovo. On 6 July 2018, Ademi is voted unanimously by 58 delegates in the Football Federation of Kosovo's Extraordinary Electoral Assembly and is elected president of the Football Federation of Kosovo for a four-year term (2018–2022) as the position of president had remained vacant after the death of Fadil Vokrri.

References

External links
Profile at Football Federation of Kosovo 

1961 births
Living people
Sportspeople from Pristina
Kosovan footballers
KF Kosova Prishtinë players
Association footballers not categorized by position